Ubaldino Peruzzi (2 April 1822 – 9 September 1891) was an Italian politician of the Kingdom of Sardinia and the Kingdom of Italy. He was twice mayor of Florence. He was a member of the Peruzzi family.  His paternal grandmother was a member of the Medici family. He was a recipient of the Order of Saints Maurice and Lazarus.

References

Bibliography
AA. VV., La Provincia di Firenze e i suoi amministratori dal 1860 a oggi, Leo S. Olschki editore, Firenze 1996.
P. Bagnoli (a cura di), Ubaldino Peruzzi. Un protagonista di Firenze capitale. Atti del Convegno (Firenze, 24-26 gennaio 1992), Impruneta (FI) 1994, pp. 312.

External links

 
 

1822 births
1891 deaths
19th-century Italian politicians
Mayors of Florence
Recipients of the Order of Saints Maurice and Lazarus
Presidents of the Province of Florence